Polranny (Poll Rathnaí, trans. Hole of the Ferns or Fern Hollow) is a village in County Mayo in the province of Connacht in the Republic of Ireland. The Michael Davitt Bridge connects Polranny on the mainland to Achill Island.

Towns and villages in County Mayo